The 1940 Montana gubernatorial election took place on November 5, 1940. Incumbent Governor of Montana Roy E. Ayers, who was first elected governor in 1936, ran for re-election. He narrowly won the Democratic primary by just over a thousand votes to win renomination, and advanced to the general election, where he was opposed by Sam C. Ford, a former Associate Justice of the Montana Supreme Court and the Republican nominee. Ultimately, in spite of the fact that then-President Franklin D. Roosevelt comfortably won the state in that year's presidential election, Ford narrowly defeated Ayers to win his first of two terms as governor.

Democratic primary

Candidates
Roy E. Ayers, incumbent Governor of Montana
Arthur F. Lamey, former Chairman of the Montana Democratic Party, former Hill County Attorney
A. E. Kathan

Results

Republican primary

Candidates
Sam C. Ford, former Associate Justice of the Montana Supreme Court
Charles A. Hauswirth, Mayor of Butte
Julius J. Wuerthner, former Mayor of Great Falls
T. S. Stockdahl
Martin P. Moe, former Secretary of the Montana Education Association
John H. Leuthold

Results

General election

Results

References

Montana
Gubernatorial
1940
November 1940 events